Juan Ricardo Roldán Trujillo (born 31 March 1986 in Lagos de Moreno) is a Mexican football goalkeeper. He currently plays for Celaya.

Career
Roldán made his professional debut for Petroleros de Salamanca on August 16, 2008, in a match against Pegaso Real Colima, which the latter won (2-0).

For the Apertura 2009, when Salamanca was dissolved and relocated to La Piedad, Roldán left as well.

Roldán has managed to secure his position as the starting goalkeeper for the Reboceros.

References

External links

1986 births
Living people
Mexican footballers
Association football goalkeepers
Salamanca F.C. footballers
La Piedad footballers
Club León footballers
Club Celaya footballers
Club Atlético Zacatepec players
Ascenso MX players
Footballers from Jalisco
People from Lagos de Moreno, Jalisco